Streptomyces lusitanus is a bacterium species from the genus of Streptomyces which has been isolated from soil. Streptomyces lusitanus produces 7-chlortetracycline, naphthyridinomycin, cyanocycline B, N-desmethylnaphthyridinomycin and tetracycline.

Further reading

See also 
 List of Streptomyces species

References

External links
Type strain of Streptomyces lusitanus at BacDive -  the Bacterial Diversity Metadatabase	

lusitanus
Bacteria described in 1963